Saint-Martin-Labouval (Languedocien: Sant Martin Laboval) is a commune in the Lot department in south-western France.

See also
Communes of the Lot department

References

Saintmartinlabouval